Tallarín saltado is a Peruvian dish that is found in chifa cuisine. The name of the dish comes from the word "stir-fry" (saltear), in which the food is fried over high heat in small pieces. To make this dish, some cooked noodles, vegetables and portions of meat are sautéed to taste. The seasoning or dressing comes from Chinese spices and sesame oil.

The dish is the local Peruvian version of chifa cuisine, and is related to Chinese dishes of stir-fried noodles with meats and vegetables known internationally as chow mein.

When combined with arroz chaufa in a single dish served generously, it is called an "aeropuerto" (or airport in English).

References 

Peruvian cuisine
Chinese fusion cuisine